ATOC may refer to:

 Acoustic thermometry
 Amgen Tour of California, a cycling race
 A Touch of Cloth, a British TV comedy series
 Rail Delivery Group, formerly the Association of Train Operating Companies, in the United Kingdom

See also
Atoc, an Inca general